Inka Martí Kiemann (born 6 January 1964) is a Spanish journalist, editor, writer, and photographer, the wife of fellow publisher  and .

Biography
Born in Beckum, West Germany, Inka Martí studied Hispanic philology at the University of Barcelona. At age 17, she began to work as a model, appearing as the face of numerous advertising campaigns. She also worked as a model in Japan, Greece, England, Austria, and Germany.

In 1986, at age 22, she made her debut before the cameras of Televisión Española, in the cultural contest , supported by the Royal Spanish Academy and designed by Professor Francisco Rico.

That July and August, coinciding with the Olympic Games, she hosted the daily program Barcelona: Juegos de sociedad. Along with Constantino Romero, she was the voice of the Barcelona Olympics at the opening and closing ceremonies, which were broadcast to 3.5 billion spectators from around the world. That November, she began appearing on La 2's news program El informe del día, directed by José Antonio Martínez Soler. Martí directed the Television Department for the advertising and television production company Ovideo. Her productions included five episodes of the series Letter from Home for the American channel CBS.

After that experience, she moved away from the cameras for a time and did not return until 1998, when she shot a five-episode documentary on Spain for the BBC, Spain, Inside Out, which was broadcast in several English-speaking countries.

In 2005 she founded the publishing house  with her husband, the editor , and in 2011 she started a new artistic career as a photographer, publishing the book Cuaderno de noche, a compilation of 65 dreams selected from thousands recorded in her eleven notebooks written since 2000. This was accompanied in digital format by Espacios oníricos, which photographically complements the world recreated in her dream journey.

Her photographic work was shown in group exhibitions in Madrid, Barcelona, Seville, and Paris from 2013 to 2014.

On 17 April 2016 she contributed a photo essay on beauty to the new magazine Fashion and Arts, and on 9 July she opened an exhibition in the Patrick Domken gallery of Cadaqués.

In April 2017 she was part of journalist María Fernández-Miranda's collective book No madres, telling the stories of women who do not want to or cannot be mothers and who make up the so-called Generación NoMo (No Mother Generation).

In January 2018 she was part of La generación del 87. Orígenes y destinos. 1987–2017, an exhibition of portraits of great photographers, where she was shown to have joined the 87 representatives of a generation that the magazine  included in a special issue in 1987.

Works
 1999: Otto (Barcanova, Barcelona), children's book, 
 2007: El tresor de Nova York (Museo d'Art, Girona), 
 2011: Cuaderno de noche (Ediciones Atalanta, Vilaür), accompanied by digital work Espacios oníricos

References

External links

 
 Ediciones Atalanta
 

1964 births
21st-century photographers
21st-century Spanish women writers
Living people
People from Warendorf (district)
Spanish female models
Spanish photographers
Spanish television journalists
Spanish television presenters
Spanish women journalists
Spanish women photographers
University of Barcelona alumni
Women television journalists
Spanish women television presenters
21st-century women photographers